The Fujifilm X-A5 is a rangefinder-styled digital mirrorless interchangeable lens camera (MILC) announced by Fujifilm, sale begun on 2018 February 15.

The X-A7 succeeds the X-A5. The new camera was announced on September 12, 2019.

Features
The Fujifilm X-A5 is the successor of the X-A3, installed new autofocus system, twice AF speed than X-A3. Also, the scene recognition accuracy and color reproducibility at the time of auto photography have evolved, especially that the reproducibility of flesh color improved.

Key Features 
 24.2 Megapixels
 23.5 mm x 15.7 mm CMOS sensor (APS-C)
 Improved autofocus than X-A3
 Tilt LCD with touchscreen
 11 types of selectable film simulations
 Hybrid autofocus
 Face detection
 Eye detection
 15P 4K video
 4K Burst, 4K Multi Focus
 WiFi connectivity
 Bluetooth connectivity

References

External links

X-A5
Cameras introduced in 2018